Egan is an unincorporated community in Ogle County, Illinois, United States, located north of Leaf River.

References

External links

NACo

Unincorporated communities in Ogle County, Illinois
Unincorporated communities in Illinois